The Cup of Macedonia (Kup na Makedonija) is the top knockout tournament and the second most important football competition in Macedonia after the Macedonian First League championship. The cup was established in 1992 after local clubs had abandoned the Yugoslav First League and Yugoslav Cup competitions following the breakup of Yugoslavia.

As of 2014, a total of 16 clubs have reached the cup finals and the most successful side in the history of the competition is Vardar, who have triumphed 5 times in their 6 cup final appearances. They are followed by Rabotnički and Sloga Jugomagnat, who have won 4 titles.

Winners 

Key

Sources:

Performance by club

Source:

Titles by city

Republic Cup 

Source:

Notes

A.  The Sloga Jugomagnat, which traced its roots back to 1927 went excluded after a missing two games in the 2009–10 season and folded in 2009. In 2012, a successor club called FK Shkupi was founded after a merger with FK Albarsa which started in the 3rd League. The club won first place in the 2012–13 season and after was a failed to promote to the 2nd League, the club was a merged with FK Korzo and a placed in the 2nd League for the 2013–14 season (in fall season was played as Korzo). However, despite club officials and fans claims that the Shkupi is the Sloga Jugomagnat's successor, neither the Football Federation of Macedonia nor UEFA recognize Sloga Jugomagnat's titles and statistics before 2009 as being part of the 2012 founded Shkupi's track record.

B.  The original Pobeda, which was traced its roots back to 1941 went banned from UEFA competitions in 2010 and will be eligible in the 2017–18 season. In 2010, a successor club called FK Viktorija (later renamed to Pobeda Junior) was founded which started competing in the 3rd league. Despite club officials and fans claims that the new Pobeda Junior is the Pobeda's successor, neither the Football Federation of Macedonia nor UEFA recognize Pobeda's titles and statistics before 2010 as being part of the 2010 founded Pobeda Junior's track record.

C.  The original Bashkimi, which was traced its roots back to 1947 went bankrupt and folded in 2008. In 2011, a successor club called FK Bashkimi 1947 was founded which started competing in the 3rd league. Despite club officials and fans claims that the new Bashkimi is the defunct club's successor, neither the Football Federation of Macedonia nor UEFA recognize Bashkimi's titles and statistics before 2008 as being part of the 2011-founded Bashkimi's track record.

References

External links
Football Federation of Macedonia 
MacedonianFootball.com 

 
Cup
Macedonia
1992 establishments in the Republic of Macedonia